Kolt or kolty was a part of a female headgear, hanging on a ryasna at both temples as a sign of family's wealth, common in 11th-13th centuries in Old Rus'. It comprised a pair of metal pieces, joined to form a hollow medallion or star that, presumably, contained a piece of cloth, impregnated with fragrances.

Origin 
The origin of the word “kolt” is obscure. As a term, it was introduced in the late 19th century in the course of ethnographic surveys. According to a version it derived from the  meaning (earrings), also in West-Ukrainian dialects “колток”. In a Novgorod dialect the word “колтки” means pendants of earrings, it was also mentioned in birch bark document No. 644, found in Novgorod, dating back to Novgorod Republic.

References

Further reading

External links 

 a kolt in the collection of Kremlin Armory Chamber, Moscow
 a star-shaped kolt in the collection of Kremlin Armory Chamber, Moscow
 a circular kolt in the collection of the Hermitage Museum, St. Petersburg
  a circular silver kolt found in the Berestye archeological site, Belarus, featuring a seed with sprouts

Kievan Rus culture
Slavic culture
Jewellery components
Russian art
Ukrainian art